Rebellion is a defiance of authority.

Rebellion may also refer to:

Film 
 Rebellion (1936 film), an American film starring Tom Keene
 Rebellion (1954 film), a Spanish-German drama film
 Rebellion (1975 film), an Argentine film
 Rebellion (2009 film), a Hong Kong film
 Rebellion (2011 film), a French film
 Rebellion, title of the American Equilibrium (2002 film) when released in Japan

Music
 Rebellion (band), a German heavy metal band
 Rebellion Festival, an annual punk rock festival held (mostly) in Blackpool, England
 Rebellion (EP), a 1995 EP by Samael
 "Rebellion" (song), a 2014 song by Linkin Park
 "Rebellion (The Clans Are Marching)", a song by Grave Digger from Tunes of War
 "Rebellion (Lies)", a 2005 song by Arcade Fire
 "Rebellion" (Britney Spears song), a 2006 song by Britney Spears

Sport
 Rebellion Racing, a Swiss motor racing team
 Rhode Island Rebellion, an American rugby league team
 WWE Rebellion, a former annual professional wrestling pay-per-view event held by World Wrestling Entertainment
 Impact Wrestling Rebellion, a current annual professional wrestling pay-per-view event held by Impact Wrestling

Other 
 Rebellion (miniseries), a 2016 Irish television miniseries
 Rebellion: Two States, an upcoming RTÉ sequel series set during the Irish War of Independence, to be produced by Zodiac Media
 Rebellion (novel), a 1924 novel by Joseph Roth
 Extinction Rebellion, environmental campaign
 Rebellion Developments, a British video game developer and comic book publisher
 Rebellion, a sword used by Dante in the Devil May Cry video game series
 Rebellion, an episode of Transformers: Prime
 Rebel Alliance, a faction in Star Wars